Town Business is a solo album released by rapper, Keak da Sneak. It was released on May 23, 2005 and was entirely produced by Big Hollis.

Track listing
"Scarface Dust"- 3:41  
"Blind to Get It"- 3:39  
"Town Business"- 4:34  
"Get That Dough"- 3:23  
"T Shirt, Blue, & Nikes Pt. 2"- 3:16  
"Support Your Own Supply"- 4:53  
"What a Relief"- 3:45  
"All My Niggas"- 3:44  
"Dopehouses & Powder"- 3:13  
"Leanin'"- 4:37  
"Lookin at Booty"- 4:08  
"Yeah!"- 4:47  
"Light Gray Shit"- 3:53

2005 albums
Keak da Sneak albums
Albums produced by Big Hollis